Vorsklytsia is a river in the Belgorod Oblast of Russia and the Sumy Oblast of Ukraine and a right tributary of the Vorskla.

The floodplains are swampy, especially in the lower reaches, the right bank is often quite steep, the left bank rather low. The gradient of Vorsklytsia is 0.77 m/km. The river freezes in early December and remains frozen until mid-March.

References

Rivers of Sumy Oblast
Rivers of Belgorod Oblast